Hiroki Kotani   (born July 11, 1971) is a Japanese mixed martial artist. He competed in the Lightweight division.

Mixed martial arts record

|-
| Loss
| align=center| 3-12-4
| Masashi Takeda
| KO (punch)
| Zst: Zst 12
| 
| align=center| 1
| align=center| 1:28
| Tokyo, Japan
| 
|-
| Win
| align=center| 3-11-4
| Anton Kuivanen
| Submission (heel hook)
| Zst: Prestige
| 
| align=center| 1
| align=center| 1:17
| Turku, Finland
| 
|-
| Loss
| align=center| 2-11-4
| Jon Friedland
| KO (punch)
| XFO: Xtreme Fighting Organization 8
| 
| align=center| 1
| align=center| 2:33
| Lakemoor, Illinois, United States
| 
|-
| Loss
| align=center| 2-10-4
| Alex Gasson
| Decision (unanimous)
| XFO 4: International
| 
| align=center| 3
| align=center| 5:00
| Lakemoor, Illinois, United States
| 
|-
| Loss
| align=center| 2-9-4
| Edson Diniz
| Submission (armbar)
| AFC 7: Absolute Fighting Championships 7
| 
| align=center| 1
| align=center| 3:01
| Fort Lauderdale, Florida, United States
| 
|-
| Draw
| align=center| 2-8-4
| Rich Clementi
| Draw
| Zst: The Battlefield 4
| 
| align=center| 3
| align=center| 5:00
| Tokyo, Japan
| 
|-
| Loss
| align=center| 2-8-3
| Mitsuo Matsumoto
| Decision (majority)
| Shooto: 2/6 in Kitazawa Town Hall
| 
| align=center| 2
| align=center| 5:00
| Setagaya, Tokyo, Japan
| 
|-
| Loss
| align=center| 2-7-3
| Takayuki Okochi
| KO (knee)
| Shooto: Treasure Hunt 9
| 
| align=center| 1
| align=center| 2:06
| Setagaya, Tokyo, Japan
| 
|-
| Draw
| align=center| 2-6-3
| Seiki Uchimura
| Draw
| Shooto: Gig East 8
| 
| align=center| 2
| align=center| 5:00
| Tokyo, Japan
| 
|-
| Loss
| align=center| 2-6-2
| Mitsuhiro Ishida
| Decision (unanimous)
| Shooto: To The Top 9
| 
| align=center| 2
| align=center| 5:00
| Tokyo, Japan
| 
|-
| Win
| align=center| 2-5-2
| Takashi Ochi
| Decision (unanimous)
| Shooto: To The Top 5
| 
| align=center| 2
| align=center| 5:00
| Setagaya, Tokyo, Japan
| 
|-
| Draw
| align=center| 1-5-2
| Takeshi Yamazaki
| Draw
| Shooto: Wanna Shooto 2001
| 
| align=center| 2
| align=center| 5:00
| Setagaya, Tokyo, Japan
| 
|-
| Draw
| align=center| 1-5-1
| Mitsuo Matsumoto
| Draw
| Shooto: R.E.A.D. 7
| 
| align=center| 2
| align=center| 5:00
| Setagaya, Tokyo, Japan
| 
|-
| Loss
| align=center| 1-5
| Tetsuharu Ikei
| KO (punch)
| Shooto: Renaxis 3
| 
| align=center| 1
| align=center| 0:35
| Setagaya, Tokyo, Japan
| 
|-
| Loss
| align=center| 1-4
| Dokonjonosuke Mishima
| Submission (rear naked choke)
| Shooto: Shooter's Passion
| 
| align=center| 1
| align=center| 4:00
| Setagaya, Tokyo, Japan
| 
|-
| Loss
| align=center| 1-3
| Kazumichi Takada
| Decision (majority)
| Shooto: Las Grandes Viajes 3
| 
| align=center| 2
| align=center| 5:00
| Tokyo, Japan
| 
|-
| Loss
| align=center| 1-2
| Takenori Ito
| Decision (unanimous)
| Shooto: Las Grandes Viajes 2
| 
| align=center| 2
| align=center| 5:00
| Tokyo, Japan
| 
|-
| Loss
| align=center| 1-1
| Caol Uno
| Decision (unanimous)
| Lumax Cup: Tournament of J '97 Lightweight Tournament
| 
| align=center| 2
| align=center| 3:00
| Japan
| 
|-
| Win
| align=center| 1-0
| Naoto Kojima
| Submission (heel hook)
| Lumax Cup: Tournament of J '97 Lightweight Tournament
| 
| align=center| 1
| align=center| 1:10
| Japan
|

See also
List of male mixed martial artists

References

External links
 

1971 births
Japanese male mixed martial artists
Lightweight mixed martial artists
Living people